Haplochromis oregosoma is a species of cichlid endemic to Uganda where it occurs in Lake George (Uganda) and the Kazinga Channel.  This species can reach a length of  SL.

References

oregosoma
Fish described in 1973
Endemic freshwater fish of Uganda
Cichlid fish of Africa
Taxonomy articles created by Polbot